The Dutch Smoushond (Hollandse Smoushond, Dutch Ratter) is a small breed of dog, related to the Pinscher and Schnauzer breed type kept in stables to eliminate rats and mice in Germany and the Netherlands. It is very rare and not well known outside the Netherlands, its country of origin.

Appearance 
The Dutch Smoushond is small in size, at the maximum 10 kg in weight and  43 cm at the withers. Its waterproof coat is rough and shaggy, and of any shade of yellow colour. The characteristic shape of the head is broad and short, with drop ears set high on the head.

History 
The Hollandse Smoushond Club (Smoushondenclub) was formed in 1905 to document and register the small stable dog as a purebred breed, as it was in danger of dying out. Its origins may have been with the ancestor of the Schnauzer breed, as an incorrect yellow colour. The name refers to its shaggy fur and face, as Jewish men (called Smouzen in the 1800s, a slur deriving from the name Moses) had beards and long hair. They were called "Dutch" to prevent confusion with the similar Brussels Griffons.  During World War II, the breed nearly disappeared. In 1973, several breeders began to reconstruct the breed with the few remaining dogs, most of whom had been crossbred with other breeds. Much of the reconstruction was accomplished with the use of Border Terrier crosses. There is illustrated reference to the breed in Dutch artist Rien Poortvliet's popular 1996 book, "Dogs."

Recognition 

Although popular in the Netherlands, the breed is not well known elsewhere in the world. It was recognised in 2001 by the Fédération Cynologique Internationale and placed in the Group 2, Section 1: Pinschers and Schnauzers, Section 1.3 Smoushond. Of the major kennel clubs in the English-speaking world, it is recognised only by the United Kennel Club in the United States (classified in its Terrier Group). It also may be found listed by some of the vast number of internet-based minor registries and dog registry businesses as a "rare breed".

See also
 Dogs portal
 List of dog breeds
 Schnauzer
 Pinscher
 Terrier

References 

Dog breeds originating in the Netherlands